A referendum on the citizenship law was held in Latvia on 3 October 1998. The Saeima had made amendments to the law in June that increased the opportunities for naturalisation and provided the additional option of obtaining Latvian citizenship for non-citizens (nepilsoņi) and stateless persons (bezvalstnieki) born in Latvia from August 1991 onwards. Voters were asked "are you for or against the repeal of the law "Amendments in the Law of Citizenship"". A majority of 53.9% voted against repealing the law.

Results

References

1998 referendums
1998 in Latvia
Referendums in Latvia
Latvian nationality law